Humoresque (or Humoreske) is a genre of Romantic music characterized by pieces with fanciful humor in the sense of mood rather than wit.

History
The name refers to the German term Humoreske, which was given from the 1800s (decade) onward to humorous tales. Many humoresques can be compared to a gigue in their dance-like qualities, and many were used as dance music from the 1700s onwards.

Notable examples
Notable examples of the humoresque style are:
Schumann's Humoreske in B-flat major (Op. 20, 1839)
Noel Rawsthorne's Hornpipe Humoresque (for organ, based on the Sailor's Hornpipe and including parts of "Rule Britannia" and the Widor Toccata)
Dvořák's set of eight Humoresques (Op. 101, 1894), of which No. 7 in G-flat major is well known.
Rachmaninoff's Humoresque in G Major (Op. 20, 1893, revised in 1940)

See also 
 Capriccio

References 

Music genres
Classical music styles

Musical forms